Adam Shand may refer to:

 Adam Shand (journalist) (born 1962), Australian writer and journalist
 Adam Shand (manager), founder of the Personal Telco Project